José María Covarrubias (c.1809 – April 1, 1870) was a Californio politician and a signer of the Californian Constitution in 1849. He also served as Santa Barbara's member of the California State Assembly from 1849 to 1862.

Life
Covarrubias born to a Spanish family from France that emigrated to Mexico in 1818. He came to California in 1834. Covarrubias became Pío Pico's private secretary in 1845. 

He married Domingo Carrillo's daughter María in 1834. They lived in Covarrubias Adobe a California Historical Landmark in Santa Barbara, California. 

In the 1830s Domingo Carrillo was a leader of the Presidio of Santa Barbara and married to  Concepción Pico Carrillo (Jan. 09, 1797 -?). Concepción and Domingo married on October 14, 1810, Concepción is the sister of Pío Pico, the last governor of Alta California. 

He served as the delegate for San Luis Obispo to the California Constitutional Convention of 1849 and was a signer of the Californian Constitution.

References

Members of the California State Assembly
19th-century American politicians
Year of birth uncertain
1870 deaths